David Pérez Asensio (born 27 September 1982) is a Spanish football manager, currently managing Belize.

Managerial career
Born in Madrid, Pérez's first foray into management was with Preferente de Madrid side Móstoles URJC in 2012. In the 2013–14 season, Pérez and his Móstoles side achieved promotion to the Tercera División. In 2018, Pérez moved to China to manage Anhui Titi Sport, staying in the country until mid-2019. Ahead of the 2019–20 season, Pérez returned to Spain to work as a youth coach for Alcorcón. 

In July 2021, Pérez was confirmed as manager of Premier League of Belize club Verdes. In January 2022, Pérez was announced as manager of the Belize national team. Following his appointment, Pérez confirmed he would continue as Verdes manager alongside his national team duties.

References

1982 births
Sportspeople from Madrid
Living people
Belize national football team managers
Spanish football managers
Association football coaches
Spanish expatriate football managers
Spanish expatriate sportspeople in China
Spanish expatriate sportspeople in Belize
Expatriate football managers in China
Expatriate football managers in Belize